Soori is a common South Indian name that may refer to :

Films
 Soori (2001 film), an Indian Telugu film starring J. D. Chakravarthy and Priyanka Upendra
 Soori (2003 film), an Indian Tamil film starring Vignesh and Parthiban

People
 Paravastu Chinnayya Soori (1807–1861), an Indian Telugu writer
 Duniya Soori, an Indian Kannada film director known mononymously as Soori
 Soori (actor), an Indian Tamil film actor and comedian

See also
 Suri (disambiguation)